Guo Guangcan (born 9 December 1942) is a Chinese physicist. He is a professor at the University of Science and Technology of China (USTC) and Peking University (PKU). He works on quantum information, quantum communication and quantum optic. He is an academician of the Chinese Academy of Sciences and The World Academy of Sciences.

Biography 
Guo was born in Hui'an County, Quanzhou, Fujian province in 1942.

Honors 
 2003, State Natural Science Second Class Award
 2003, AWARDEE OF THCHNOLOGICAL SCIENCES PRIZE
 2003, members of the Chinese Academy of Sciences
 2009, Fellow of THE WORLD ACADEMY OF SCIENCES

Selected papers 
 Beating the standard quantum limit: phase super-sensitivity of N-photon interferometers
 Efficient Scheme for Two-Atom Entanglement and Quantum Information Processing in Cavity QED
 Experimental control of the transition from Markovian to non-Markovian dynamics of open quantum systems
 Experimental investigation of classical and quantum correlations under decoherence
 Experimental investigation of the entanglement-assisted entropic uncertainty principle

References 

Living people
Educators from Fujian
Members of the Chinese Academy of Sciences
Academic staff of Peking University
People from Quanzhou
Physicists from Fujian
Quantum physicists
TWAS fellows
Academic staff of the University of Science and Technology of China
Year of birth missing (living people)